A list films produced in Pakistan in 1999 (see 1999 in film) and in the Urdu language:

1999

See also
1999 in Pakistan

External links
 Search Pakistani film - IMDB.com

1999
Pakistani
Films
Pakistani film-related lists